Airthings Masters can refer to three online chess tournaments:
2020 Airthings Masters, a chess tournament that was part of the Champions Chess Tour 2021 from November 2020–October 2021
2022 Airthings Masters, a chess tournament that was part of the Champions Chess Tour 2022 from February–November 2022
2023 Airthings Masters, a chess tournament that was part of the Champions Chess Tour 2023